Saratov Governorate (Saratovskaya guberniya, Government of Saratov), was an administrative division (a guberniya) of the Russian Empire and the Russian Socialist Federative Soviet Republic, which existed from 1797 to 1928. Its administrative center was in the city of Saratov.

History
On December 25, 1769, the Saratov province was established as part of the Astrakhan Governorate.

On January 11, 1780, Empress Catherine the Great issued a decree of the establishment of the Saratov governorship of the northern districts of the Astrakhan Governorate to begin on November 7 of that year, followed by a decree on who will lead the new governorship.

For the grand opening of the Saratov governorship, on February 3, 1781,  the Astrakhan governor, along with lieutenant-general Jacobi and Bishop Anthony arrived from Astrakhan.

On August 23, 1781 the Empress issued a decree approving the emblems of the city of Saratov and several Saratov governorship county-level cities (Atkarsk, Balashov,  Kamyshin, Khvalynsk, Kuznetsk, Petrovsk, Serdobsk, Tsaritsyn, and Volsk).

In 1796, 41 of the governorships which were created by Catherine II had been abolished by her son Emperor Paul I of Russia including a decree on December 12, 1796 to abolish the Saratov governorship, and have its uyezds distributed between Penza and Astrakhan province. Because of the decree of March 5, 1797 Penza province was renamed Saratov province and Saratov was appointed a provincial city. On October 11, 1797 from the Saratov governorate the governorates of Tambov, Nizhny Novgorod and Simbirsk were established, from the rest of the Saratov province decree dated September 9, 1801 the Penza Governorate  was established.

In 1802 Novokhopyorsky Uyezd was ceded to the Voronezh Governorate, and Chernoyarsky Uyezd was ceded to the Astrakhan governorate.

In 1835 three new uyezds were created - Nikolayevsk, Novouzensk and Tsarevsky. In 1851 Tsarevsky Uyezd was transferred to the Astrakhan governorate, and Nicholas and Novouzensk Uyezd - to the newly created Samara Governorate.

Because of the decree of July 5, 1878, the coat of arms of Saratov province was approved with the depiction of an azure shield, in which three silver starlet are placed in a forked cross. The shield is crowned by the imperial crown and surrounded by golden oak leaves emblazoned with St. Andrew's cross.

In 1918, part of the governorate was incorporated into the newly formed autonomous region of the Volga Germans.

In 1919, part of Kamyshinsky (returned in 1920) and Tsaritsynsky uyezds were transferred to the newly formed Tsaritsyn governorate. The structure of the governorate came from the province of Samara, Nicholas Uyezd and Novouzensk Uyezd.

In 1920, due to downsizing Novouzensk Uyezd formed Dergachyovsky and Pokrovsk Uyezds.

In 1921, due to downsizing Atkarsky Uyezd formed Yelansky Uyezd.

In 1922 Pokrovsk Uyezd was transferred to the Volga German Autonomous Soviet Socialist Republic.

In 1923, the Khvalynsky Uyezd was abolished, its territory is divided between Volsky Uyezd and Kuznetsky Uyezd. Dergachyovsky District was formed through consolidation of Novouzensk Uyezd and Elansky Uyezd with Atkarskaya Uyezd.

In a Resolution of the All-Russian Central Executive Committee on May 21, 1928 Saratov Governorate was abolished and its territory was included in the Lower Volga Oblast, which was later turned into Saratov Krai and Saratov Oblast.

Subdivisions
The Saratov Governorate was divided into 10 uyezds:
Atkarsky Uyezd
Balashovsky Uyezd
Kamyshinsky Uyezd
Khvalynsky Uyezd
Kuznetsky Uyezd
Petrovsky Uyezd
Saratovsky Uyezd
Serdobsky Uyezd
Tsaritsynsky Uyezd
Volsky Uyezd

Demography

Language
Population by mother tongue according to the Imperial census of 1897.

Religion
According to the Imperial census of 1897.

Notable people
 Sergei Bobokhov, Russian revolutionary, who committed suicide as a protest against the flogging of woman comrade in Siberia.

References
 The First General Census of the Russian Empire of 1897. Breakdown of population by mother tongue and districts in 50 Governorates of the European Russia (1777 territorial units)

Further reading
 

 
1797 establishments in the Russian Empire
1928 disestablishments in Russia